Anil Dhasmana is the Current Chief of National Technical Research Organisation(NTRO). He was also the Chief of the Research and Analysis Wing(R&AW), India's foreign intelligence service. He was appointed as the Chief of R&AW as the post fell vacant on 31 January 2017 following the retirement of the incumbent.

Biography
Dhasmana was born on 2 October 1957 in Pauri, Uttarakhand and holds an M.Com. degree from Uttar Pradesh. He is 1981-batch Madhya Pradesh cadre IPS officer and was appointed on 3 December 1981. His domain of expertise is considered to be Balochistan, counter-terrorism and Islamic affairs. He also has a vast experience on Pakistan and Afghanistan. 

He served as Chief of Station in  London and Frankfurt and Chief of Station, SAARC & Europe desks. Before being appointed as the secretary, he was posted from 13 March 2015 as a Special Secretary.

References

1957 births
Living people
People from Pauri
Indian police officers
Spymasters
Indian spies
People of the Research and Analysis Wing
People from Uttarakhand
People of the insurgency in Balochistan